Minuscule 295 (in the Gregory-Aland numbering), ε 379 (Soden), is a Greek minuscule manuscript of the New Testament, on parchment. Paleographically it has been assigned to the 13th century. 
It has marginalia.

Description 

The codex contains a complete text of the four Gospels on 239 parchment leaves, with only one lacuna (Matthew 1:1-12). Matthew 1:1-12 was added by a later hand in 16th or 17th century.

The text is written in one column per page, in 24-25 lines per page.

Text 

The Greek text of the codex is a representative of the Byzantine text-type. Aland did not place it in any Category.

According to the Claremont Profile Method it represents Π1441 in Luke 1 and Luke 20. In Luke 10 no profile was made.

History 

The manuscript was added to the list of New Testament manuscripts by Scholz (1794-1852). 
It was examined and described by Paulin Martin. C. R. Gregory saw it in 1885.

The manuscript is currently housed at the Bibliothèque nationale de France (Gr. 120) at Paris.

See also 

 List of New Testament minuscules
 Biblical manuscript
 Textual criticism

References

Further reading 

 

Greek New Testament minuscules
13th-century biblical manuscripts
Bibliothèque nationale de France collections